Shashikant Narsingrao Khedekar is Shiv Sena politician from Buldhana district, Maharashtra. He is a member of the 13th Maharashtra Legislative Assembly and represents the Sindkhed Raja Assembly Constituency.

Positions held
 2014: Elected to Maharashtra Legislative Assembly

See also
 Buldhana Lok Sabha constituency

References

External links
 Shiv Sena Official website

Maharashtra MLAs 2014–2019
Living people
Shiv Sena politicians
People from Buldhana district
Marathi politicians
1954 births